Luke Pryor (July 5, 1820August 5, 1900) was a U.S. senator from the state of Alabama. He was appointed to fill the Senate term left by the death of George S. Houston and served from January 7 to November 23, 1880, when a replacement was elected. Pryor was a Democrat. He is interred at City Cemetery in Athens, Alabama.

Biography

Birth and Parentage 

He was born in 1820 in Alabama to parents Luke Pryor and Ann Batte Lane. His father's first marriage was to Martha Scott, a sister of General Winfield Scott.   His brother was the noted race horse trainer John Benjamin Pryor of Natchez, Mississippi.

Life in Alabama 

Pryor married Isabella Virginia Harris.  They were the parents of 8 children, all born in Alabama. Luke Pryor lived at the Sugar Creek Plantation, in Athens, Alabama, for 40 years before his death. Pryor House , built in 1836, stands as a historic building in Limestone County, Alabama. Pryor studied law and was admitted to the bar in 1841. On the 1850 United States Census his occupation was recorded as "lawyer."

Luke Pryor was a slave owner.  On the 1840 Census 6 free blacks under the age of 10 were recorded in his father's household, as well as 1 male slave child under 10 and an older female between the ages of 55 and 100. By 1850, Luke Pryor was recorded with 39 slaves between the ages of 70 years old and as young as 4 months; however in 1860 only two slaves were recorded in his household. The American Civil War did not begin until April 12, 1861, and slavery was not completely abolished until 1865 after the ratification of the Thirteenth Amendment.

References

External links 
 

1820 births
1900 deaths
People from Athens, Alabama
Democratic Party members of the Alabama House of Representatives
Democratic Party United States senators from Alabama
Democratic Party members of the United States House of Representatives from Alabama
19th-century American politicians